Betty Carmichael Pariso (née Slade; born January 29, 1956) is an American professional female bodybuilder. She was the world's oldest active professional female bodybuilder while competing.

Biography 
Betty Pariso (born Betty Slade) was born in 1956 in Cynthiana, Kentucky to Harold Coleman Slade and Dorothy Florence Slade. She has two sisters, Kay and Ann, and a brother, Terry. She grew up on a farm, enjoying a healthy and athletic lifestyle that included much volleyball and track. Her athletic prowess in the field even attracted the attention of university scouts. Ping-pong was also a fixture of her childhood. She grew up without television, but often visited her grandmother to enjoy her programs as a child. She became a part-time model and a minister's wife in her earlier years.

Bodybuilding career

Amateur

Betty started weight training in her early 30s to stay fit and add weight to what she thought was too much of a "stick figure" type of body. In 1988, she began competing in bodybuilding and was able to achieve pro card status at the 1996 NPC Nationals. This was a very high achievement for Pariso as by doing this she had become the oldest (at the age of 40) woman to earn an IFBB Pro card.

Professional

As a professional competitor, Betty's main goal was to win a pro show as the only competitor over the age of fifty. She became one of the most successful competitors in professional female bodybuilding by reaching the top six in almost every competition she has entered. In 2001, she won the heavyweight class at the Jan Tana Classic, which made this the first pro win of her career. There was no overall champion in that contest. She had to withdraw from the 2009 Ms. International due to a high fever. Later she went on to win her second pro title, the 2009 Tampa Bay Pro.

Retirement

After the 2010 Phoenix Pro contest, Betty retired from bodybuilding at the age of 54.

Legacy

In October 1996, Betty won the NPC Nationals and became the first woman in history at age 40 to earn her IFBB professional status. In 2006, she won the 2006 female athlete of the year at the Flex Awards for her outstanding achievement in the industry. In 2009, she achieved her goal of became the first female bodybuilder above the age of 50 years to win an IFBB professional competition, by winning the 2009 Tampa Bay Pro. She is currently IFBB's Athlete Representative in women's bodybuilding, where she has used her position to suggest a weight class system for the professional bodybuilders and a new division contest for women bodybuilders and fitness/figure competitors.

In 2010, Betty received LifeTime Achievement Award at Europa Dallas. The rock band Pariso, formed in 2009, is named after Betty Pariso. She was the world's oldest active female bodybuilder while competing.

Contest history
 1992 AAU Ms America - 2nd (MT)
 1992 Lee Labrata - 1st
 1993 Lone Star - 1st
 1993 NPC Junior Nationals - 13th (HW)
 1994 NPC Junior Nationals - 1st (MW)
 1994 NPC USA Championships - 4th (MW)
 1995 NPC USA Championships - 3rd (HW)
 1996 NPC Nationals - 1st (HW)
 1996 NPC USA Championships - 3rd (HW)
 1997 IFBB Jan Tana Pro Classic - 15th
 1998 IFBB Jan Tana Pro Classic - 5th
 1998 IFBB Ms. International - 11th
 1999 IFBB Jan Tana Pro Classic - 4th
 1999 IFBB Ms. International - 14th
 1999 IFBB Pro Extravaganza - 4th
 1999 IFBB World Pro Championships - 5th
 2000 IFBB Jan Tana Pro Classic - 2nd (HW)
 2000 IFBB Ms. International - 6th (HW)
 2001 IFBB Jan Tana Pro Classic - 1st (HW)
 2001 IFBB Ms. International - 5th (HW)
 2001 IFBB Ms. Olympia - 6th (HW)
 2002 IFBB Jan Tana Pro Classic - 2nd (HW)
 2002 IFBB Ms. International - 5th (HW)
 2003 IFBB Ms. International - 2nd (HW)
 2003 IFBB Ms. Olympia - 6th (HW)
 2004 IFBB Ms. International - 3rd (HW)
 2004 IFBB Night of Champions - 2nd (HW)
 2004 IFBB Show of Strength Pro Championship - 2nd (HW)
 2004 IFBB Ms. Olympia - 4th (HW)
 2005 IFBB Ms. International - 3rd (HW)
 2005 IFBB Charlotte Pro Championships - 2nd (HW)
 2005 IFBB Ms. Olympia - 8th
 2006 IFBB Ms. International - 5th
 2006 IFBB Atlantic City Pro - 5th
 2006 IFBB Ms. Olympia - 6th
 2007 IFBB Ms. International - 5th
 2007 IFBB Ms. Olympia - 6th
 2008 IFBB Ms. International - 4th
 2008 IFBB Ms. Olympia - 7th
 2009 IFBB New York Pro Championships - 2nd
 2009 IFBB Tampa Bay Pro - 1st
 2009 IFBB Ms. Olympia - 6th
 2010 IFBB Phoenix Pro - 2nd
 2010 IFBB Ms. International - 5th

Personal life

Betty currently lives in North Richland Hills, Texas. She has been remarried to Ed Pariso since the early 1990s. She has a daughter named Lacye Carmichael, and a son named Justin Carmichael, from her first marriage. She also has two grandchildren, James and Logan Carmichael.

References

Jones, Dick. NPC Junior Nationals. Nebraska: Muscle Mag International (no. 151). January 1995. USPS 4601. (Lincoln, NE: Canusa Products/Foote & Davies, 1995.). Contest News Section: pages 222-224 cover NPC Junior Nationals.

External links

1956 births
American female bodybuilders
Living people
People from Cynthiana, Kentucky
People from North Richland Hills, Texas
Professional bodybuilders
Sportspeople from Kentucky
Sportspeople from Texas
Sportswomen from Kentucky
21st-century American women
20th-century American women